Clytocerus americanus is a species of moth fly belonging to the family Psychodidae.

Physical description

Larva 
The larvae have two prominent, horn-like projections situated in front and to the side of their head. They have hard tergites, underdeveloped sternites, and inconspicuous respiratory fans.

Pupa 
The pupa have pinna on the apex of their respiratory horn. They have paired spines posteriorly and laterally on their anal division, the lateral spines are serrated along both the anterior and lateral margins.

Adult 
In males, their eyebridge has three facet rows, divided by a width of 2 facet diameters. The suture situated between their eyes has a faint inverted U-shaped, with no corniculi. The area around the male terminalia (genitalia) consists of a posteriorly rounded hypandrium (the area underlying the genitalia) and 12–15 retinacula on each surstylus. 

The female terminalia consists of a bilobed subgenital plate that’s posterior margin is broadly V-shaped.

Biology 
There is limited information on the natural history of most species within the genus Clytocerus.

Their diet mainly consists of fungal mycelia and various microorganisms which inhabit wet to moist environments. Larvae are assumed to be detritivores. They are normally nocturnal and can be seen crowding lights in the evening. Adults in greatest numbers between June and August

Distribution 
Clytocerus americanus is the only Nearctic species of the genus Clytocerus. They can be found throughout the eastern United States, but have also been found as far west as California and as far north as Ontario.

Habitat 
They can be found in organically rich, semi aquatic habitats. They spend much of their time resting on vegetation in perpetually moist or marginal habitats, such as woodland streams or springs.

References

Psychodidae